Alan Rankin is a sound editor. He was nominated at the 82nd Academy Awards for Star Trek in the category of Best Sound Editing, his nomination was shared with Mark Stoeckinger

He also works for video games such as Resident Evil 4. He is a member of Todd Soundelux.

Selected filmography

Iron Man 3 (2013)
Jack Reacher (2012)
Prometheus (2012)
Unstoppable (2010)
Star Trek (2009)
Mission: Impossible III (2006)
The Day After Tomorrow (2004)
2 Fast 2 Furious (2003)
The Italian Job (2003)
The Last Samurai (2003)
Windtalkers (2002)
The 6th Day (2000)
Final Destination (2000)
Mission: Impossible 2 (2000)
Supernova (2000)
Vertical Limit (2000)
American Beauty (1999)
Godzilla (1998)
Courage Under Fire (1996)
The Hunchback of Notre Dame (1996)
Heat (1995)
Congo (1995)
Outbreak (1995)
Pocahontas (1995)
Dennis the Menace (1993)
In the Line of Fire (1993)
Home Alone 2: Lost in New York (1992)

References

External links

Sound editors
Living people
Year of birth missing (living people)